Utricularia caerulea, the blue bladderwort, is a very small to medium-sized carnivorous plant that belongs to the genus Utricularia. U. caerulea spans a wide native range, including areas in tropical Africa, Asia, and Australia. It was originally described and published by Carl Linnaeus in 1753.

Synonyms 
U. caerulea spans a wide distribution and is a very variable species, leading to a great deal of synonymy.
Calpidisca takenakai Nakai
Pelidnia caerulea (L.) Barnhart
Utricularia albiflora Griff.
U. albina Ridl.
U. baueri Benth.
U. bifida Macrae ex A.DC.
U. caerulea var. filicaulis (Wall. ex A.DC.) Haines
U. campestris Miq. ex C.B.Clarke
U. capillaris D.Don
U. cavalerii Stapf
U. charnleyensis W.Fitzg.
U. complanata Wall.
U. filicaulis Wall.
U. filicaulis var. papillosa Pellegr.
U. kerrii Craib
U. nivea Vahl
U. nivea var. rosea (Edgew.) Trimen
U. obscura R.Br. ex Benth.
U. obtusiloba Benj.
U. ophirensis Ridl.
U. paucifolia Benj.
U. purpurea Willd. ex Benj.
U. racemosa Wall.
U. racemosa var. filicaulis (Wall. ex A.DC.) C.B.Clarke
U. racemosa var. rosea (Edgew.) Thwaites
U. ramosa Vahl
U. rosea Edgew.
U. roseopurpurea Stapf ex Gamble
U. sampathii Subr. & Yogan.
U. sootepensis Craib
U. squamosa Benj.

See also 

 List of Utricularia species

References 

caerulea
Carnivorous plants of Africa
Carnivorous plants of Asia
Carnivorous plants of Australia
Carnivorous plants of the Pacific
Flora of China
Flora of Guam
Flora of Japan
Flora of Korea
Flora of Madagascar
Flora of New South Wales
Flora of Palau
Flora of Queensland
Flora of Taiwan
Flora of tropical Asia
Flora of the Northern Territory
Eudicots of Western Australia
Lamiales of Australia
Plants described in 1753
Taxa named by Carl Linnaeus
Flora without expected TNC conservation status